Flying High On Your Love is an album by the Memphis, Tennessee-based funk band The Bar-Kays.

Reception

Released on Mercury Records in the Fall of 1977, this  album would chart at number  seven on the Billboard Soul Album charts. It was also the first album by the band to be certified Gold by the Recording Industry Association of America for sales of over 500,000 copies in the United States. Song for song, it is considered by many fans to be the Bar-Kays' best album overall. Aside from the two hit singles, "Let's Have Some Fun" and "Attitudes", the track "You Can't Run Away" was also a hit that received much radio play. The album opener "Shut the Funk Up", and its closing title track "Flying High on Your Love" were equally popular. The album's success, along with their previous album, and acclaimed concert performances on tour dates with Parliament-Funkadelic, established the Bar-Kays as one of the key bands of the funk genre in the late 1970s.

Track listing
All songs written by The Bar-Kays.
"Shut The Funk Up" 4:20  	   	
"Standing on the Outside" 4:18 		
"Woman of the Night" 3:50		
"Whatever It Is" 2:10		
"Can't Keep My Hands Off You" 3:20
"Let's Have Some Fun" 6:05		
"Attitudes" 2:01
"You Can't Run Away" 4:50		
"Flying High on Your Love" 3:50

Charts

Singles

Samples
Eazy-E sampled "Let's Have Some Fun" on his song "No More ?'s" on his debut album Eazy-Duz-It in 1988.

References

External links
 The Bar-Kays-Flying High On Your Love at Discogs

1977 albums
Bar-Kays albums
Mercury Records albums